Donald Lee Beebe (born December 18, 1964) is an American football former wide receiver and coach who is the head football coach at Aurora University. He previously played in the National Football League (NFL) for nine seasons, primarily with the Buffalo Bills. In addition to his six seasons with the Bills, who selected him in the third round of the 1989 NFL Draft, he was a member of the Carolina Panthers during their inaugural season and played for the Green Bay Packers in his last two seasons.

A member of the Bills teams that lost four consecutive Super Bowls, Beebe achieved recognition for preventing an opposing touchdown by forcing a fumble in Super Bowl XXVII, despite the Bills facing an insurmountable deficit. He made two further Super Bowl appearances with the Packers and was part of the team that won Super Bowl XXXI over the New England Patriots. Beebe pursued a coaching career after his retirement and was hired as Aurora's head football coach in 2019.

Early years
Beebe is one of five children of Don and Barb Beebe. He attended Kaneland High School in Maple Park, Illinois where he lettered in basketball, track and football, graduating in 1983. After attending Western Illinois University, he transferred to Chadron State College in Nebraska, where he set several school football records his senior year and ran a 6.3 60-yard dash on the indoor track team.

In his sole season with Chadron State, Beebe caught 49 passes for 906 yards and rushed 10 times for 81.  He became the first player in school history to score a touchdown in every game, while also setting single-season school records for most all-purpose yards (1,661), points scored (90), and touchdowns (15).  In 2000, Beebe was inducted into Chadron State's athletic hall of fame.

As of 2020, he still holds the following Chadron State football records:
 Most TD Catches in a game: 4 vs. Black Hills State, 1988
 Most TDs Scored: 5 vs. Black Hills State, 1988
 Kick Returns and Kick Return Yards in a season: 29 for 722 yards, 1988

NFL career

Beebe was drafted by the Buffalo Bills in the third round (82nd pick overall) of the 1989 NFL Draft. He posted impressive statistics in speed and agility drills at the 1989 pre-draft combine.

In his nine NFL seasons, Beebe caught 219 passes for 3,416 yards, rushed for 28 yards, returned 81 kickoffs for 1,735 yards, and scored 25 touchdowns (23 receiving, one kickoff return, and one fumble recovery). He appeared in five Super Bowls as a player: XXVI, XXVII, and XXVIII with the Buffalo Bills (missing XXV due to injury) and XXXI and XXXII with Green Bay. While Buffalo lost its four consecutive title games, Beebe ultimately won a Super Bowl with the Packers in XXXI.

Beebe is well known for making one of the most memorable plays in Super Bowl history during XXVII against the Dallas Cowboys. In the game's fourth quarter, Cowboys defensive tackle Leon Lett recovered a Bills fumble and advanced the ball toward the end zone. However, Lett began to celebrate prematurely by holding the ball out to his right side. Although the Bills were losing 52–17 at the time, a relentless Beebe streaked down the field and knocked the ball out of Lett's hands just before he crossed the goal line. The loose ball went through the end zone and out of bounds for a touchback and prevented a Dallas touchdown, which would have given them a Super Bowl-record 58 points, plus (presumably) an extra point kick. Beebe also caught two passes for 50 yards, including a 40-yard touchdown reception from Frank Reich earlier in the game.

Beebe recalled that he was upset that the Bills were "getting killed", and that the play "didn't mean nothing to me. Nothing. Until I got in the locker room, and Ralph Wilson, the owner, came right over to me, he bypassed every other player and he came right to me, and said 'You showed me a lot today. You showed me exactly what the Buffalo Bills are all about.' " "I didn't realize what an impact a professional athlete has", Beebe added, until he received thousands of letters from both Buffalo and Dallas fans who praised the play and Beebe himself for not giving up.

Beebe also became known for a play that is known in some circles as the "Pogo Stick Play." In a 1989 playoff game against the Cleveland Browns, Beebe jumped up for a pass, and in the process was hit in the legs by Browns safety Felix Wright. The momentum of the hit flipped Beebe over as he fell down, landing squarely on his head, causing him to briefly bounce back upwards before falling to the field. While he was shaken up on the play, Beebe recovered enough to play in the second half. The slow-motion of Beebe's landing has since become a staple of NFL Films highlights. According to Beebe, he tore a neck muscle on the hit and nearly suffered paralysis. Beebe says that he still gets occasional numbness in his right arm as a result of the play.

Beebe was one of several Bills who formed the core of the Carolina Panthers when it was founded in 1995. He only played for one season with the Panthers before finishing his career with the Packers. With injuries ravaging the Packers' receiving corps in 1996, Beebe ended up being the Packers' second-leading receiver, with 39 receptions, 699 receiving yards, 4 touchdown receptions, as well as the only kickoff return touchdown of his career. His standout game came in an overtime battle against the San Francisco 49ers, where Beebe had 11 receptions for 220 yards and one touchdown in a 23–20 Packer victory.

Beebe has always been highly respected by players and coaches because of his strong work ethic and character. He was honored as an "Unsung Hero" in 1996 at the NFL Players Association Awards Banquet.

Coaching career
In 1998, Beebe founded House of Speed, LLC, a company that specializes in training athletes in the essentials of top performance, speed and character. House of Speed began franchise operations in 2006 and has locations in eleven states. Beebe also works with several professional, collegiate and amateur sports organizations in the area of speed, including the Chicago Bears, the Los Angeles Rams, the University of Illinois Fighting Illini and Club Fusion Volleyball.

In 2004, Beebe began coaching football for Aurora Christian Schools in Aurora, Illinois. He—along with his brother, defensive coordinator David Beebe, and brother Dan, the school's athletic director—led the Eagles to the school's first state championship appearance in 2008, where the team finished as 4A state runner-up after losing to Bloomington Central Catholic 37–28. Three years later Beebe and the Eagles returned to the finals, this time winning the 2011 IHSA Class 3A State Championship with a 34–7 win over Mt. Carmel. In 2012, Beebe led the Eagles to a second straight IHSA Class 3A State Championship by defeating Tolono-Unity 42–12 before stepping down as coach after the 2013 season and an overall 97–26 record. His brother succeeded him as head coach.

In November 2018, Beebe was named the head coach at Aurora University, replacing Rick Ponx, who was fired just the day before.

Personal life
In 2000, Chadron State renamed its renovated football stadium after Beebe, calling it Elliott Field at Don Beebe Stadium.

Beebe wrote a book with Denise Crosby titled Six Rings from Nowhere. As of 2014, a deal was in the works to develop the book into a feature film about Beebe's life and Christian faith.

Beebe has served as the honorary chairman of the Wisconsin Chapter of Make-A-Wish Foundation, worked with the Fellowship of Christian Athletes and Athletes in Action, has made numerous appearances for charity organizations from the Cub Scouts to the Cystic Fibrosis Foundation, and has held a golf tournament each year to benefit Chadron State College.

Beebe's son, Chad, was a wide receiver for Northern Illinois University, a wide receiver for the Minnesota Vikings NFL team from 2018 to 2022, and has been a wide receiver for the Houston Texans since 2022.

Head coaching record

College

References

External links
 
 Aurora profile
 House Of Speed—sports and training performance company run by Beebe
 

1964 births
Living people
American football wide receivers
Aurora Spartans football coaches
Buffalo Bills players
Carolina Panthers players
Chadron State Eagles football players
Green Bay Packers players
Western Illinois Leathernecks football players
College men's track and field athletes in the United States
High school football coaches in Illinois
Sportspeople from Aurora, Illinois
People from Chadron, Nebraska
Players of American football from Illinois